On 10 April 2022, a cable-car collision was reported at Trikut Hill in Deoghar district, Jharkhand, India. At least three people were killed and others were injured. Helicopters and the army are called for rescue. Over 38 people have been rescued.

References

2022 disasters in India
2020s in Jharkhand
21st century in Jharkhand
April 2022 events in India
Cable car disasters
Disasters in Jharkhand
Filmed deaths in Asia
Transport disasters in India